Thendo Mukumela (born 30 January 1998) is a South African professional soccer player who plays for the South African soccer club AmaZulu and the South Africa national football team.

Club career
Born in Limpopo, South Africa, Mukumela started his career at Mamelodi Sundowns before joining Ajax Cape Town in 2018.

In June 2022, Mukumela joined AmaZulu.

International career
Mukumela has represented South Africa at under-17, under-20, under-23 and senior international levels.

Notes

References

1998 births
Living people
South African soccer players
Soccer players from Limpopo
Association football defenders
Cape Town Spurs F.C. players
AmaZulu F.C. players
National First Division players
South Africa international soccer players
South Africa youth international soccer players
South Africa under-20 international soccer players
Footballers at the 2020 Summer Olympics
Olympic soccer players of South Africa